Robert Onsare Monda is a Kenyan politician. He belongs to NARC and was elected to represent the Nyaribari Chache Constituency in the National Assembly of Kenya in the 2007 Kenyan parliamentary election.currently he is the deputy governor for kisii county under his head His honourable Governor Paul Simba Arati for the year 2022 to 2027

References

Living people
Year of birth missing (living people)
National Rainbow Coalition – Kenya politicians
Members of the National Assembly (Kenya)